Whitney is an Old English surname that derives from the location of Whitney in Herefordshire, England. It was first mentioned in the Domesday Book with the spelling Witenie. The name probably refers to the River Wye which runs through the area and which can become a torrent when heavy rains in the Welsh mountains cause it to swell. This surname has also been used as a first name for both males and females, and many locations around the world have been named Whitney after individuals with this name.

Notable people
 Adeline Dutton Train Whitney (1824–1906), American writer 
 Amos Whitney (1832–1920), American mechanical engineer and inventor
 Arthur Whitney (disambiguation), several people
 Asa Whitney (1797–1872), American merchant and railroad visionary
 Asa Whitney (canal commissioner) (1791–1874), American inventor, politician and manufacturer
 Ashley Whitney (born 1979), American freestyle swimmer
 Benson Whitney (born 1956), American businessman and ambassador
 Betsey Cushing Roosevelt Whitney (1908–1998), American social figure
 Bill Whitney (Willard Whitney) (active since 1979), American broadcaster
 Carl Whitney (1913–1986), American Negro league baseball player
 Charlotte Anita Whitney (1867–1955), American suffragist, civil rights activist, and Communist
 Chris Whitney (born 1971), American basketball player
 Cornelius Vanderbilt Whitney (1899–1972), American financier and horse breeder
 Courtney Whitney (1897–1969), American lawyer and Army commander during World War II
 Daniel Lawrence Whitney (born 1963), American comedian better known as Larry the Cable Guy
 Dorothy Payne Whitney (1887–1968), American heiress and philanthropist
 Edward Baldwin Whitney (1857–1911), American judge and political organizer
 Edwina Whitney (1868–1970), American librarian and college professor
Eleanore Whitney (1917–1983), American film actress
 Eli Whitney (1765–1825), American inventor of the cotton gin
 Elizabeth Whitney (treasurer) (active 1987–1989), American politician
 Elizabeth Ann Whitney (1800–1882), Church of Jesus Christ of Latter-day Saints leader, wife of Newel Kimball Whitney
 Ghostemane (born Eric Whitney), American rapper
 George Whitney (disambiguation), several people
 Gertrude Vanderbilt Whitney (1875–1942), American social figure, wife of Harry Payne Whitney
 Glayde Whitney (1939–2002), American geneticist
 Gil Whitney (1940–1982), American television weather forecaster 
 Grace Lee Whitney (1930–2015), American actress
 Harry Payne Whitney (1872–1930), American businessman and thoroughbred horsebreeder
 Harry Whitney (1873–1936), American hunter and author who was in Greenland at the same time as Peary and Cook
 Hassler Whitney (1907–1989), American mathematician, one of the founders of singularity theory
 Henry Martyn Whitney (1824–1904), newspaper founder in the Kingdom of Hawaii
 Henry Melville Whitney (1839–1923), American industrialist
 James Whitney (disambiguation), several people called James or Jim
 Joan Whitney Payson (1903–1975), American heiress (née Whitney)
 John Whitney (disambiguation), several people called John or Jon
 Josepha Newcomb Whitney (1871 – after 1955), American clubwoman, pacifist, suffragist, and politician
 Josiah Whitney (1819–1896), American geologist, chief of the California Geological Survey, for whom Mount Whitney is named
 Kahlil Whitney (born 2001), American basketball player
 Katherine Whitney Curtis (1896–1979), creator of Synchronized Swimming
 Lenar Whitney (born 1959), Louisiana politician
 Marva Whitney (1944–2012), American funk singer
 Mary Watson Whitney (1847–1921), American astronomer
 Marylou Whitney (1925–2019), American horseracing figure, widow of Cornelius Vanderbilt Whitney
Meredith Whitney (born 1969), American businesswoman 
 Newel Kimball Whitney (1795–1850), Church of Jesus Christ of Latter-day Saints leader
 Orson F. Whitney (1855–1931), Church of Jesus Christ of Latter-day Saints leader
 Pauline Payne Whitney (1874–1916), American heiress
 Payne Whitney (1876–1927), American businessman
 Phyllis A. Whitney (1903–2008), American mystery writer
 Ray Whitney (disambiguation), several people  
 Richard Whitney (disambiguation), several people called Rich or Richard
 Robert Whitney (disambiguation), several people
 Ruth Reinke Whitney (1928–1999), American magazine editor
 Ryan Whitney (born 1983), American ice hockey player
 Thomas Whitney (disambiguation), several people called Thomas or Tom
 William Whitney (disambiguation), several people
 Willis Rodney Whitney (1869–1958), American scientist

Fictional characters 
 Geraldine Weldon Whitney Saxon (active 1970–1984), Grand Dame widow to Senator Gordon Whitney and crime boss Anthony Saxon from The Edge of Night

See also
Whitney family
Witney (name)
Whitley (surname)

English-language surnames
Surnames of English origin
English toponymic surnames